Darrin Zammit Lupi (born 1968) is a Maltese photographer and journalist.

Biography 
Zammit Lupi was born in 1968 in Malta. He began his career as a photographer with The Malta Independent newspaper in 1992, but shortly thereafter became a freelance photographer. He studied at the University of the Arts London from which he earned a master's degree in Photojournalism and Documentary photography.

In 1996, Zammit Lupi started working as a photographer with the Times of Malta and in the following year he became a freelance correspondent for Reuters. His work documents the migration crisis in the Mediterranean, the devastating Tsunamis of Southeast Asia, the Millennium Development Goals in different areas of Africa, the 2009 L'Aquila earthquake, the Costa Concordia disaster, the Libyan conflict, and other international events.

Works 
Zammit Lupi has published two books, Isle Landers and Off the Job.

Isle Landers was published in 2014. It is composed of photos taken by Zammit Lupi from 2005 to 2014 regarding the migratory situation in the Mediterranean. In these photos, Zammit Lupi photographed the migrants from their rescue at sea, upon arrival in Europe at the immigration centers, until their departure. The purpose of the book is to combat racism and xenophobia and raise awareness of the international public about the struggles of African and Middle Eastern migrants.

Off the Job was published in 2015 and is composed of photos taken with an iPhone by Zammit Lupi in non-working contexts. Lupi prefers the iPhone when taking photos for pleasure; according to him, "it is the ideal way to recharge my creative energies".

Awards

See also 

European migrant crisis

References

External links 
Guide to the Darrin Zammit Lupi photojournalism archive, 2017 December 15–19

Maltese photographers
Reuters people
1968 births
Living people
Alumni of the University of the Arts London